New Jersey's 8th Legislative District is one of 40 in the New Jersey Legislature, covering the Atlantic County municipality of Hammonton; the Burlington County municipalities of Eastampton Township, Evesham Township, Hainesport Township, Lumberton Township, Mansfield Township, Medford Township, Medford Lakes Borough, Mount Holly Township, Pemberton Borough, Pemberton Township, Shamong Township, Southampton Township, Springfield Township, Westampton Township and Woodland Township; and the Camden County municipalities of Berlin Borough, Pine Hill Borough, and Waterford Township as of the 2011 apportionment.

Demographic characteristics
As of the 2020 United States census, the district had a population of 221,840, of whom 175,200 (79.0%) were of voting age. The racial makeup of the district was 164,132 (74.0%) White, 22,489 (10.1%) African American, 541 (0.2%) Native American, 9,191 (4.1%) Asian, 141 (0.1%) Pacific Islander, 7,333 (3.3%) from some other race, and 18,013 (8.1%) from two or more races. Hispanic or Latino of any race were 20,055 (9.0%) of the population.

The district had 177,065 registered voters as of July 1, 2021, of whom 63,392 (35.8%) were registered as unaffiliated, 59,938 (33.9%) were registered as Democrats, 51,684 (29.2%) were registered as Republicans, and 2,051 (1.2%) were registered to other parties.

Political representation
For the 2022–2023 session, the district is represented in the New Jersey Senate by Jean Stanfield (R, Westampton) and in the General Assembly by Michael Torrissi (R, Hammonton) and Brandon Umba (R, Medford).

The legislative district overlaps with New Jersey's 1st, 2nd and 3rd congressional districts.

1965–1973
During the period of time after the 1964 Supreme Court decision in Reynolds v. Sims and before the establishment of a 40-district legislature in 1973, the 8th District encompassed the entirety of Somerset County. During the three Senate elections held during this period (1965, 1967, and 1971), Republicans won all three races. Incumbent Senator William E. Ozzard won reelection in 1965 for a two-year term (though he resigned on July 10, 1967), while for the next two elections, Raymond Bateman was victorious for both elections.

In the terms from 1967 until 1973, the 8th District sent two members to the General Assembly. In all elections for two-year terms, Republicans won both seats. John H. Ewing was one victor in the three regular elections (1967, 1969, 1971), while Webster B. Todd Jr. (son of Webster B. Todd, brother of Christine Todd Whitman) served one term from 1968 until 1970, Millicent Fenwick was elected in 1969 and 1971, but resigned on December 14, 1972, to become head of the New Jersey Division of Consumer Affairs, and Victor A. Rizzolo was elected in a special election on January 30, 1973, to complete her term.

District composition since 1973
When the Legislature was switched to 40 equal-population districts statewide, the 8th District created for the 1973 elections was an uncompact district in Burlington, Ocean, Monmouth, and Mercer counties. With the Keith line as a center spine, the district had branches to Medford Township, Manchester Township, Florence Township, Roosevelt, East Windsor Township, and Lawrence Township. In the 1980s, the 8th became inclusive of most of Burlington County stretching from Washington Township north to Bordentown. Following the 1990 Census, the district expanded out of Burlington County to Camden County (Winslow Township, Waterford Township, and Chesilhurst) and Atlantic County (Hammonton and Folsom) with the Burlington County portion including suburban townships of Medford, Evesham, Moorestown, Mount Laurel, and Southampton. The 2001 redistricting returned the district to being Burlington only again keeping it through the center of the county.

Election history

Election results, 1973–present

Senate

General Assembly

Election results, 1965–1973

Senate

General Assembly

References

Atlantic County, New Jersey
Burlington County, New Jersey
Camden County, New Jersey
08